Kristina Knejp (born 24 February 1974 in Stockholm) is a Swedish rower.

References 
 
 

1974 births
Living people
Swedish female rowers
Sportspeople from Stockholm
Olympic rowers of Sweden
Rowers at the 1996 Summer Olympics

World Rowing Championships medalists for Sweden
20th-century Swedish women